Trail Blazer, released in 1992, is the second album of the Turkish heavy metal band Mezarkabul. The album was released by the German independent record label Nuclear Blast.

Track listing

Notes
Two live performances, "Vita es Morte" and "Powerstage" (from the album Pentagram), are added in the CD version of the album. 
Also, a video clip was shot for the first track, "Secret Missile".
"Fly Forever" is tributed to bands old guitarist Ümit Yılbar, who was killed by Kurdish separatist PKK terrorists on the mountain of Cıraf while serving the Turkish Army.

1992 albums
Mezarkabul albums